Minuscule 822 (in the Gregory-Aland numbering), Nμ22 (von Soden), is a 12th-century Greek minuscule manuscript of the New Testament on parchment, with a commentary.

Description 
The codex contains the text of the Gospel of Matthew, with a commentary, on 281 parchment leaves (size ), with some lacunae.

The text is written in one column per page, 28 lines per page.

According to C. R. Gregory it contains a catena to the Gospel of Mark.

Text 
The Greek text of the codex Kurt Aland did not place in any Category.

History 

The manuscript is presently assigned to the 12th century on palaeographic grounds by the Institute for New Testament Textual Research.

It was added to the list of New Testament manuscripts by Gregory (822e).

The manuscript is now housed at the Biblioteca Nacional de España (4739) in Madrid.

See also 

 List of New Testament minuscules
 Biblical manuscript
 Textual criticism
 Minuscule 821

References

Further reading 

 

Greek New Testament minuscules
12th-century biblical manuscripts